Paolo Casoli (born 18 August 1965 in Castelnovo ne' Monti) is a former Italian Grand Prix motorcycle road racer. His best year in Grands Prix was in 1987, when he won the 125cc Portuguese Grand Prix and finished in third place in the 125cc world championship. From 1994 to 1996, Casoli competed in the Superbike World Championship, and in 1997 he won the Supersport World Series, which later became known as the Supersport World Championship. He continued racing in the Supersport class until 2002.

References 

1965 births
Sportspeople from the Province of Reggio Emilia
Italian motorcycle racers
125cc World Championship riders
250cc World Championship riders
Superbike World Championship riders
Supersport World Championship riders
Living people